Gaston Alfonso Browne (born 9 February 1967) is an Antiguan politician serving as the prime minister of Antigua and Barbuda and leader of the Labour Party since 2014. Before entering politics, he was a banker and businessman.

Early life
Browne was born on 9 February 1967, days before the Associated State of Antigua was established, in the Villa area on the twin island of Antigua and Barbuda. His life as a teenager was extremely tough. As a child, he lived in Point with his paternal great-grandmother, who was in her eighties, at the time, partially blind, poor and aging. After her passing, he later grew up in Point, another impoverished area.

Education
After completing his secondary education, Browne attended the City Banking College in the United Kingdom, where he graduated with a BSc in banking and finance. Later, he attended University of Manchester, acquiring an MBA in Finance.

Career
Following graduation, Browne secured a position with the Swiss American Banking Group, a major banking consortium in Antigua and Barbuda, comprising offshore and onshore banks and a trust company, eventually rising to the position of Commercial Banking Manager.

He entered the political arena in 1999, when he was elected to parliament for the constituency of St. John's City West. He was appointed Minister of Planning, Trade, Industry, Commerce and Public Service Affairs in his first term as an MP.

Prime Minister
Gaston Browne led the Antigua and Barbuda Labour Party to victory in the 12 June 2014 general election, after 10 years in opposition, winning 14 out of 17 seats. Browne was sworn in as Prime Minister on 13 June 2014. He defeated Baldwin Spencer's UPP, which had ruled for 10 years. Browne holds the additional office of Minister of Finance.

Aftermath of Hurricane Irma
On 6 September 2017 Hurricane Irma swept through Barbuda. Gaston Browne stated that the Category 5 storm had destroyed 95% of the structures and vehicles. Initial estimates showed that at least 60% of the island's residents were homeless because of the disaster. All communications with Barbuda were completely down for a time; most of the communications system had been destroyed.

On 8 September 2017, Browne described the situation as follows during an interview. "Barbuda right now is literally a rubble" with no water or phone service; he said there had been only a single fatality. The government had almost completed the evacuation of the entire island; nearly 1,800 people were transferred to Antigua.

On the same day, the first of three cargo planes arrived from the US, with over 120,000 pounds of relief for Barbuda. The cost was covered by the Government of Antigua and Barbuda and by donations from Martin Franklyn and the Coleman Company in the US. Also on 8 September, Browne discussed Barbuda's urgent needs with Administrator Mark Green of the United States Agency for International Development. USAID had already sent a Disaster Assistance Response Team and would continue to coordinate with the government and relief organizations.

Browne's government was facing a massive challenge. An estimate published by Time indicated that over $100 million would be required to rebuild homes and infrastructure. Philmore Mullin, Director of Antigua and Barbuda's National Office of Disaster Services, said that "all critical infrastructure and utilities are non-existent – food supply, medicine, shelter, electricity, water, communications, waste management". He summarised the situation as follows: "Public utilities need to be rebuilt in their entirety ... It is optimistic to think anything can be rebuilt in six months ... In my 25 years in disaster management, I have never seen something like this."

Republicanism

During a visit by the Earl and Countess of Wessex for the celebration of Queen Elizabeth II's Platinum Jubilee, Browne asked the Earl if the couple would use their diplomatic influence to support reparations for slavery to Caribbean Community nations and announced that his country will transition to a republic. Following the death of the Queen, Browne announced that he would call for a referendum on the country becoming a republic within three years. In an interview for ITV he stated “This is not an act of hostility or any difference between Antigua and Barbuda and the monarchy, but it is the final step to complete that circle of independence, to ensure that we are truly a sovereign nation.“ and added that the country would remain a member of the Commonwealth regardless of the outcome.

Family and personal life
Browne is married to Maria Bird-Browne, niece of the second Prime Minister Lester Bird. The couple have a son, Prince Gaston Browne, who was Browne's fourth child, as he had three children prior to marriage. They had a second child, a daughter, in September 2020.

References

External links

Biography
Government's Official website

|-

|-

|-

|-

|-

1967 births
21st-century heads of government in North America
Antigua and Barbuda Labour Party politicians
Prime Ministers of Antigua and Barbuda
Finance ministers of Antigua and Barbuda
Leaders of political parties
Living people
Privatization controversies
People from Saint John Parish, Antigua
Antigua and Barbuda republicans